Kevin Winston Rattray (born 6 October 1968) is an English former professional footballer.

Born in Tottenham, he began his career with Broadfields United of the Middlesex County League.  In 1993, he joined Woking, and two years later signed for Gillingham of the Football League Third Division for a transfer fee of £5,000. He made 31 appearances for the Kent-based club, scoring three goals, before moving to Barnet in September 1996 for a fee of £15,000.  In 1998, he dropped back into non-league football with Kingstonian.

Honours 
Woking
 FA Trophy: 1993–94, 1994–95

References

1968 births
Living people
English footballers
Woking F.C. players
Gillingham F.C. players
Barnet F.C. players
Kingstonian F.C. players
Welling United F.C. players
Enfield F.C. players
Harrow Borough F.C. players
Association football midfielders